The 2004 European Parliament election in Luxembourg was the election of MEP representing Luxembourg constituency for the 2004–2009 term of the European Parliament. It was part of the wider 2004 European election. It was held on 13 June 2004. The national parliamentary elections took place simultaneously.

The ruling Christian Social People's Party polled strongly, while the opposition Luxembourg Socialist Workers' Party lost ground.

Candidates

Results

The Luxembourg electoral system allows each voter to cast as many votes as there are
members to be elected. These figures show the number of votes cast for each party, 
not the number of voters who cast them. Voting at European Parliament elections is obligatory (as is the case with all other kinds of elections in the country).

Luxembourg
European Parliament elections in Luxembourg
European Parliament election